Lena is a department or commune of Houet Province in south-western Burkina Faso. Its capital lies in the town of Lena.

Towns and villages
 Bona

References

Departments of Burkina Faso
Houet Province